Akhire Akhire is a 2014 Odia romance, drama, comedy film produced by Sitaram Agrawal. The film features Babushaan and Jhilik in the lead roles. The film is a remake of Telugu movie Ishq.

Synopsis
Shiva's parent and his sister Priya leave him alone due to his mischievous personality. But after Shiva promises to be gentle Priya with her parent return to Shiva. Meanwhile, Priya encounter love interest with Rahul and by knowing this Shiva tries to kill Rahul and held unsuccessful. Rahul tries to maintain closer relation with Priya's parent and at last Shiva realizes his mistake and helps unite Rahul and Priya.

Cast
 Babushaan as Rahul
 Siddhanta Mahapatra as Shiva
 Jhilik Bhattacharya as Priya
 Samaresh Routray as Kala
 Bijay Mohanty as Shiva's father
 Aparajita Mohanty as Shiva's mother
 Harihara Mahapatra as Rahul's friend
 Smitha Mohanty as Jaya
 Sasmita Pradhan as Puja

Soundtrack
The soundtrack of the film was composed by Malay Misra and was distributed worldwide by Sarthak Music.

References

External links
 

2014 films
2010s Odia-language films
Odia remakes of Telugu films
Films directed by Susant Mani